Bianca Bustamante (born 19 January 2005) is a Filipino racing driver. She is currently competing for Prema Racing in the Formula 4 UAE Championship and F1 Academy.

Career

W Series 
From 31 January 2022 to 4 February 2022, Bustamante competed in a W Series test in Arizona, United States along with 14 other prospective drivers. She then participated in a second pre-season test in Barcelona on 2–4 March along with 11 other potential drivers and 9 automatic qualifiers from the previous W Series season. On 22 March 2022, Bustamante was confirmed to compete in the 2022 W Series season.

Formula 4 UAE Championship 
On 9 January 2023, Bustamante was announced to race under Italian team Prema Powerteam for the 2023 Formula 4 UAE Championship.

F1 Academy 
On 3 February, Bustamante was confirmed as the second driver to compete in the newly launched all-female F1 Academy series, with Prema Racing.

Personal life
Bustamante resides between Laguna, Philippines and San José, California, and is the daughter of Raymund and Janice Bustamante. Her sporting and business career is managed by race driver Darryl O'Young.

Bustamante is an advocate for non-fungible tokens, launching a series titled The Dark Horse with her manager Darryl O'Young as a way of financing her career.

Racing record

Racing career summary 

* Season still in progress.

Complete W Series results
(key) (Races in bold indicate pole position) (Races in italics indicate fastest lap)

Complete F4 UAE Championship results 
(key) (Races in bold indicate pole position) (Races in italics indicate fastest lap)

* Season still in progress.

References

External links 
 
 Profile at W Series
 Bianca Bustamante personal website

Living people
2005 births
W Series drivers

Racing drivers from California
Racing drivers from San Jose, California
UAE F4 Championship drivers
F1 Academy drivers
Prema Powerteam drivers
Filipino female racing drivers
Sportspeople from Manila
Filipino expatriate sportspeople in the United States